Mitikha is a rural locality (a village) in Slobodskoye Rural Settlement, Kharovsky District, Vologda Oblast, Russia. The population was 4 as of 2002.

Geography 
Mitikha is located 27 km northeast of Kharovsk (the district's administrative centre) by road. Vaulikha is the nearest rural locality.

References 

Rural localities in Kharovsky District